Celtic Reptile & Amphibian is a conservation company, established in 2020, by Harvey Tweats and Tom Whitehurst, with the aim of reintroducing extinct reptiles and amphibians back to rewilding projects within the UK. It is based in Leek, Staffordshire.

The company was conceptualised after founder Harvey Tweats visited the River Otter beaver trial, where Eurasian Beavers were reintroduced, creating habitats that would have supported extinct amphibian species, as they are ecosystem engineers. However, the beaver was hunted to extinction in the 16th century, leading amphibian species to also slip into extirpation, only for beavers to be released hundreds of years later, after the extinction of many amphibian species. This means the only way these species could return is through direct reintroduction. Tweats was also inspired by reintroduction expert Derek Gow. Later, Tom Whitehurst joined, handling the technical and accounting aspects of Celtic Reptile & Amphibian. 

In 2020, a site was developed to help upscale the breeding effort with financial help from a range of environmentalists, including Ben Goldsmith and Sir Charles Burrell. The breeding facility is the largest of its type, dedicated only to European species in an open-air environment. Eventually it will house more reptiles than Chester Zoo.

Thus far, success has been achieved with the moor frog, as it has been successfully bred in captivity by the company, sparking talk of reintroduction, as it was likely extirpated by deforestation (in western Europe and the UK).

The European pond turtle has also been put forward as a reintroduction candidate, as the climate is warming, making habitat more suitable. The organisation has the largest captive group of the species.

In response to worries about the potential transfer of diseases (like chytrid which causes chytridiomycosis) from captive animals to the wild, a biosecurity protocol was enacted. It included ecologically certified newt fences, sanitising stations and footdips. All breeding stock is tested with PCR testing.

Proposed species for reintroduction 

Celtic Reptile & Amphibian undertake research with many partners. This is focussed on feasibility of species reintroduction and examining evidence for species native status.

Currently, 5 species of herptile are classed as extirpated in the UK, and suitable for reintroduction;

 Agile frog (Rana dalmatina) - extinct reliably in the 9th century, as indicated by subfossil remains. It has already been reintroduced to Jersey, by Durrell Wildlife Conservation Trust.
 European tree frog (Hyla arborea) - while a potential native colony survived until 1987, reliable historical records suggest that this species was found in Britain by at least the 16th century, for example Sir Thomas Browne wrote in 1646; "...the little frog of an excellent Parrat green, that usually sits on [t]rees and [b]ushes, and is therefore called Ranunculus viridis, or  arboreus...", thus it is listed as an extinct-native.
 European pond turtle (Emys orbicularis) - surviving until the Neolithic, this chelonian qualifies as a native British species as evidenced by fossils and sedaDNA analysis. However, it most likely went extinct due to climatic deteroration. Celtic Reptile & Amphibian hope that a warming climate will open up opportunities for the restoration of this species.
 Pool frog (Pelophylax lessonae) - this is the only species in which it has already been reintroduced to Britain, both intentionally and accidentally.
 Moor frog (Rana arvalis) - several subfossil specimens represent this species, showing it was native to East Anglia at least in the 9th century. A historical reference by Bartholomeus Anglicus talks of "Rana palustres" pushing the extinction date to the 13th century. Furthermore, research indicates that fenland drainage and deforestation were the most likely factors in the species' demise.

Rewilding efforts 
The company also helps to advise estates, NGOs and farmers on how they can rewild their landholdings. They define rewilding as “the large scale restoration of ecosystems through the provision of protecting land from human uses, and re-introducing lost natural processes with the ultimate aim of letting nature take care of itself. This may include, but not limited to, the reintroduction of extinct species”. Tweats has stated that the company has an advisory acreage of 12,000.

References 

Rewilding
Companies established in 2020
Companies based in Staffordshire
British companies established in 2020
Environmentalism in England